Edward Victor Henry Emmett, known as E. V. H. Emmett (17 June 1902, London - 7 June 1971, London), was a British newsreader.  Though his main job was as a commentator for Gaumont British News, he was frequently used as a narrator for films from the 1930s to 1950s. In the first series of Dad's Army broadcast in 1968 he was the narrator over the humorous short Public Information Films of the platoon seen at the beginning of each episode. By the time of the colour episodes in 1969 the films had been discontinued.

Emmett was born in Brixton in London in 1902, the son of Elizabeth Annie née Denyer (1871–) and Josephus Walter Victor Emmett (1872–1941), an insurance clerk. In addition to his work as a narrator Emmett was also a screenwriter for Under the Southern Cross (1957), Dance Hall (1950), Bothered by a Beard (1945, which he also produced and directed), The Lion Has Wings (1939) and Sabotage (1936), along with additional dialogue for Young Man's Fancy (1940), The Ware Case (1938) and Non-Stop New York (1937).

He married Ethel M Stanton (1897-) in 1929 in London. In 1939 the couple were living in Marylebone in London. The marriage was later dissolved. In 1949 he married Joyce Annette Stanley (1917-1997) in London.

E. V. H. Emmett lived at 4 Montpelier Court on Montpelier Road in Ealing, London W.5. On his death in Ealing in 1971 he left £624 in his will.

Filmography
Narrator unless otherwise noted.

References

External links

http://www.screenonline.org.uk/film/id/560335/

1902 births
1971 deaths
English male screenwriters
English film directors
English male voice actors
20th-century English male actors
People from Brixton
20th-century English screenwriters
20th-century English male writers